Luis Villa is an American attorney and programmer who worked as Deputy General Counsel and then as Senior Director of Community Engagement at the Wikimedia Foundation. Previously he was an attorney at Mozilla, where he worked on the revision of the Mozilla Public License (MPL). He continued that work in his next job at Greenberg Traurig where he was part of the team defending Google against Oracle's claims concerning Android. Prior to graduating from Columbia Law School in 2009, he was an employee at Ximian, which was acquired by Novell in 2003. He spent a year as a "senior geek in residence" at Harvard's Berkman Center for Internet & Society working on StopBadware.org. He has been elected four times to the board of the GNOME Foundation. He was editor-in-chief of the Columbia Science and Technology Law Review, and blogs regularly. He was a director of the Open Source Initiative from April 2012 to March 2015.

In 2017 he co-founded Tidelift, which seeks to improve the ecosystem around open source software by providing support for professional teams using open source and helping maintainers build sustainable businesses around their projects.

See also
 List of Wikipedia people

References

External links

Interview with Red Hat magazine
Villa's Blog

American bloggers
American computer programmers
American lawyers
GNOME developers
Columbia Law School alumni
Living people
Year of birth missing (living people)
Members of the Open Source Initiative board of directors
Wikimedia Foundation staff members
Berkman Fellows
American Wikimedians